"A Little Bit in Love" is a song recorded by American country music artist Patty Loveless.  It was released in June 1988 as the third single from her album If My Heart Had Windows.

Background
"A Little Bit in Love" was originally recorded by its writer Steve Earle in 1985.  His version did not chart.

The Patty Loveless version charted for 18 weeks on the Billboard Hot Country Singles and Tracks chart, reaching #2 during the week of September 10, 1988.

Charts

Weekly charts

Year-end charts

References

1985 songs
1985 singles
1988 singles
Patty Loveless songs
Steve Earle songs
MCA Nashville Records singles
Song recordings produced by Tony Brown (record producer)
Song recordings produced by Emory Gordy Jr.
Songs written by Steve Earle